This is a list of covers of Time magazine between 2020 and 2029. Time was first published in 1923. As Time became established as one of the United States' leading news magazines, an appearance on the cover of Time became an indicator of notability, fame or notoriety.  Such features were accompanied by articles.

European, Middle Eastern, African, Asian and South Pacific versions of the magazine were published in addition to the United States edition. This article distinguishes versions when the covers are different.

For other decades, see Lists of covers of Time magazine.

2020

2021

2022

2023

References

External links
 Time The Vault

2020s
Covers of Time magazine
Covers of Time magazine
Time magazine (2020s)